Linslade Tunnel is a railway tunnel in Bedfordshire, England, on the West Coast Main Line about  north of Leighton Buzzard railway station and built under Linslade Woods. Consisting of three individual bores, the tunnel is somewhat unusual as there is a slight bend in its alignment.

The first bore was constructed during the 1830s, the engineering of which having been performed by the pioneering railway builder George Stephenson. The only of the three bores to accommodate double track, it was first opened to traffic during 1837. During 1857, the eastern bore was opened to serve a branch line from Leighton Buzzard to Dunstable; this has since been closed. In 1876, the western bore was completed, being noticeably narrower than its predecessors. During the 1960s, Linslade Tunnel was outfitted with overhead electrification as part of a wider scheme to introduce electric traction on the West Coast Main Line. In the 1970s, the tunnel portals on either side of the tunnel were recognised as Grade II listed buildings due to their connection to early railway engineering history. During the 2010s, remedial engineering works were performed in the tunnel.

History

Construction
A total of three bores have been constructed to date, the first of these being the central bore. This is the tallest of the three, and the only one that carries twin tracks. It was also the first tunnel on the site to be constructed, an individual contract for its construction on behalf of the London and Birmingham Railway being issued around 1834, shortly after the purchasing of land along the route was authorised by an Act of Parliament in 1833. The engineering work was performed by the pioneering railway builder George Stephenson. The local geology largely consisted of clay and iron sand. Atypically, the bore has a slight curvature or bend along its length. This first bore was completed during 1837, and services commenced running through it thereafter. Contemporary accounts around the time of its opening described the original Linslade Tunnel as being relatively spacious.

During 1859, the eastern bore became the second to open, carrying a single track to serve a branch line from Leighton Buzzard to Dunstable, which has since been permanently closed. In 1876, the single track western bore was the third to open, it is the narrowest tunnel of the three. The northern portals were finished with a brick castellated retaining wall that incorporated all three of the horseshoe-shaped arches. On 1 May 1975, the northern portals were recognised as a grade II listed building, the listing text observing that it is "an interesting example of early railway architecture". The southern entrance has also been listed despite being noticeably less ornamental than its northern counterpart.

Architecture
The tower facade is only on one side of the tunnel. This is as it is the side  passengers would be travelling towards London from.

Activity and services

During the 1960s, Linslade Tunnel, along with the majority of the West Coast Main Line, had overhead electrification apparatus installed, which facilitated the line's transition to using electric traction.

On 9 December 1982, during the British Rail era, a fatal incident occurred at Linslade Tunnel, an inadequately secured load that had fallen from one train was struck by the next train passing through the tunnel, causing its derailment and the death of its driver.

During the late 2010s, deteriorated parts of the brickwork within Linslade Tunnel were repaired. In early 2020, the tunnel was again subject to engineering works, largely focused upon a comprehensive track renewal, to improve service reliability.

The eastern bore and the eastern side of the central bore are used by goods traffic and West Midlands Trains services to and from London Euston respectively to mainly local stations including traffic using the Northampton Loop Line connecting to and from Birmingham, Rugby, as well as several stations further to the north.

See also
 List of tunnels in the United Kingdom

References

Citations

Bibliography

 E.C. and W. Osborne. "Osborne's London & Birmingham railway guide." E.C. & W. Osborne, 1840.
 Freeling, Arthur. "The railway companion, from London to Birmingham, Liverpool, and Manchester." Whittaker & Co, 1838.

External links
 Period Linslade Tunnel drawing by John Cooke Bourne via sciencemuseumgroup.org.uk
 Image of the approach to Linslade Tunnel via avantiwestcoast.co.uk
 Ventilation shaft details via mapio.net

Railway tunnels in England
Rail transport in Bedfordshire
Tunnels in Bedfordshire
Grade II listed buildings in Bedfordshire